Trombidium mastigotarsum is a species of mite in the genus Trombidium in the family Trombidiidae. It is found in Romania.

Name
The name is derived from Ancient Greek mastix "whip" and tarsus "ankle".

References
 Synopsis of the described Arachnida of the World: Trombidiidae

Further reading
  (1956): Nouveaux acariens parasites des insectes nuisable appartenant au genre Phyllotreta.

Trombidiidae
Animals described in 1956
Arachnids of Europe